Vermont's 5th congressional district is an obsolete district. It was created in 1821.  It was eliminated after the 1840 Census.   Its last Congressman was John Mattocks.

Vermont began with district representation when it was admitted as the 14th State in 1791.

From  1813-1821, beginning with the 13th Congress, Vermont elected its US Representatives statewide At-Large

After the 16th Congress,  Vermont returned to electing Congressmen from districts

Vermont added the 5th district in 1821, Vermont was apportioned a fifth congressional district after the 1810 Census however this, along with the likewise created sixth district were constituted at-large until 1821, and then from 1823-25.

List of members representing the district

References

 Congressional Biographical Directory of the United States 1774–present

05
Former congressional districts of the United States
1821 establishments in Vermont
1843 disestablishments in Vermont
Constituencies established in 1821
Constituencies disestablished in 1843